Elections to South Ayrshire Council area were held on 6 May 1999, alongside elections to the Scottish Parliament. Elections were held for all 30 seats. With a majority in the election, Labour won.

Election result

Ward Results

Troon

Prestwick and Monkton

Ayr

Kyle

Carrick

References

1999 Scottish local elections
1999
20th century in South Ayrshire